Mari Gorman is an American actress perhaps best known for her work in television, particularly as a frequent guest star on the 1970s and 1980s sitcom Barney Miller, but she is also known for her theater acting. She has won several acting awards, including two Obie Awards. She is the author of Strokes of Existence: The Connection of All Things, which is about a long-term, formal investigation of acting that realizes Shakespeare's words, "All the world's a stage, and all the men and women merely players." (As You Like It, Act II, Sc 7.)

Biography 
Mari Gorman had her first professional role in Arnold Wesker's The Kitchen, directed by Jack Gelber, with Rip Torn. She has won Obie Awards for three acting performances: in Walking to Waldheim, by Mayo Simon, directed by George L. Sherman at Lincoln Center; The Memorandum, by Vaclev Havel, directed by Joseph Papp at The Public Theatre; and The Hot L Baltimore, by Lanford Wilson, directed by Marshall W. Mason at The Circle In-the-Square (with Circle Repertory Company), for which she also received the Theatre World Award, Drama Desk Award and Clarence Derwent Award. Other highlights include the lead role of The Girl in The Red Convertible, by Enrique Buenaventura, in the premiere production of The Third Stage (Tom Patterson Theatre) at Stratford Shakespeare Festival, Ontario; the role of Pam in the American premiere of Saved by Edward Bond, with the Yale Repertory Theatre; and the role of Kathy in the world premiere of Moonchildren (originally titled Cancer) by Michael Weller at The Royal Court Theatre in London.  She has acted in numerous television series and has taught acting on both coasts, in her own studios as well as at Loyola University in Los Angeles, and as a Lecturer-in-Acting as a repertory company member at the Yale Drama School. She has directed several productions in New York and L.A., where she won a Drama-Logue Award for her direction of Vanities, by Jack Heifner.  In 1974, after Hot L, she began a formal investigation of acting which has led to discoveries that pertain to numerous disciplines in addition to acting. In 2007 she published Strokes of Existence: The Connection of All Things, about this work, which continues. She has a BA in Theatre, and MA in Liberal Studies (Transformations of Modernity) CUNY Graduate Center, 2017.

Her first major TV role was as murder victim and mob pawn Taffy Simms on the television soap opera The Edge of Night in the 1970s. She also had a regular role in the Barbara Eden sitcom Harper Valley PTA, playing PTA member, Vivian Washburn, and was a frequent guest star on the 1970s and 1980s sitcom Barney Miller, including as an amateur prostitute housewife (in Season 4, Episode 3, "Bugs") and as a police detective with a jealous husband (in Season 4, Episode 18, "Wojo's Problem," and other episodes). She has had numerous recurring or guest starring roles in many other television shows, and her film career has included roles in Goodbye, Columbus (1969), The Taking of Pelham One Two Three (1974), 10 (1979), Oh, God! Book II (1980), and made for television movies, Curse of the Black Widow (1977), Choices of the Heart (1983) and Kids Don't Tell (1985).

She has produced and directed theatre in New York and Los Angeles, and teaches acting. Among other productions, in 1981 in Los Angeles and 2003 in New York, she produced and directed Cries for Peace, composed of firsthand accounts of Hiroshima and Nagasaki atomic bomb survivors performed by multi-ethnic casts. In 2010 she founded the New York City theater company, Glass Beads Theatre Ensemble, and produced and directed playwright Michael Locascio's Lily of the Conservative Ladies, at the June Havoc Theatre; and produced, directed and, with Danna Call and Craig Pospisil, co-wrote Browsing, performed as part of the 2011 New York International Fringe Festival.

Awards
 1967–68 season Obie Award for Distinguished Performances in Walking to Waldheim and The Memorandum.
 1972–73 Obie Award for Distinguished Performance in The Hot l Baltimore 
1972–73 Theatre World Award for The Hot l Baltimore
1972–73 Drama Desk Award for Outstanding Performance in The Hot l Baltimore
 1973 Clarence Derwent Award, The Hot l Baltimore
Drama-Logue Award, director, Vanities.

Notes

References

External links 
 

American soap opera actresses
American television actresses
Living people
American stage actresses
Obie Award recipients
Theatre World Award winners
Drama Desk Award winners
Clarence Derwent Award winners
20th-century American actresses
21st-century American actresses
American film actresses

1944 births
Actresses from New York City